Hamadi Dhaou (born 10 January 1940) is a Tunisian footballer. He competed in the men's tournament at the 1960 Summer Olympics.

References

External links
 

1940 births
Living people
Tunisian footballers
Tunisia international footballers
Olympic footballers of Tunisia
Footballers at the 1960 Summer Olympics
Footballers from Tunis
Association football defenders